Fairbanks is an unincorporated community in Wasco County, Oregon, United States.

Fairbanks was established in 1905 as a station on the Great Southern Railroad. It was named for Charles W. Fairbanks, then newly elected vice president under Theodore Roosevelt. Fairbanks post office was established in 1905 and ran until 1909, when it closed out to Freebridge. Freebridge soon closed out to Wrentham. Both locales were also Great Southern stations.

References

External links
History of Wasco County, Oregon by William H. McNeal

Unincorporated communities in Wasco County, Oregon
1905 establishments in Oregon
Populated places established in 1905
Unincorporated communities in Oregon